Qasemabad-e Bikheh Deraz (also Romanized as Qāsemābād-e Bīkheh Derāz) is a village in Now Bandegan Rural District, Now Bandegan District, Fasa County, Fars Province, Iran. At the 2006 census, its population was 35, in 7 families.

References 

Populated places in Fasa County